Hat Wanakon National Park is a sand beach and marine national park in Prachuap Khiri Khan Province, western Thailand. It overlaps two districts of Prachuap Khiri Khan: Mueang Prachuap Khriri Khan and Thap Sakae, with an area of 23,750 rai ~ . The beach is on Petchkasem Road (Highway 4) about 23 km (14 mi) from Prachuap Khiri Khan town towards Thap Sakae, about 300 km (186 mi) from Bangkok.

History and geography
This area was originally a forest park. Later it was upgraded to a national park in 1992, the 76th national park and the 18th marine national park in Thailand. The landscape here is sparse wooded with various species such as Indian thorny bamboo, Burmese rosewood, crape myrtle, Queen's flower and teak.

The twin islands,  Ko Chan (เกาะจาน) and Ko Tai-si (เกาะท้ายทรีย์), are about seven kilometres (four miles) offshore. Surrounding them is the most abundant coral reef in the Gulf of Thailand. It contains many species of corals, soft corals and other aquatic creatures for a distance of approximately two kilometres (one mile) and a depth of approximately 8–10 m (26.25-32.8 ft). The rare species Acropora cytherea can be found here. Fishing boats are not allowed to enter the area.

See also
List of national parks in Thailand
List of islands of Thailand
List of Protected Areas Regional Offices of Thailand

References

Beaches of Thailand
Tourist attractions in Prachuap Khiri Khan province
National parks of Thailand